"Black Nite Crash" is a single by English shoegazing band Ride, from their album Tarantula. It reached number 67 in the UK Singles Chart on 24 February 1996. This single was released shortly before the band's break up, and was awarded single of the week by the weekly music magazine Melody Maker.

Track listing

Track 4 features a short untitled bonus track after "A Trip Down Ronnie Lane" and 11:08 of silence. The track, which is approximately 0:23 in duration uses the same tune as "Wilmot" by Sabres of Paradise (a single from 1994), which in turn uses a sample of a track from 1931 by Wilmoth Houdini entitled "Black But Sweet"

Credits
Ride
Loz Colbert - drums
Steve Queralt - bass
Mark Gardener - vocals, rhythm guitar
Andy Bell - vocals, lead guitar

Additional musicians
Nick Moorbath - piano, Rhodes, Hammond 
Jeff Scantlebury - percussion

Technical personnel
negativespace - design
Paul Motion - engineering
Richard "Digby" Smith - Producer
Mark Freegard - mixing

References

1996 singles
Songs written by Andy Bell (musician)
1995 songs
Creation Records singles
Ride (band) songs